NTT Europe Online was merged into its parent company NTT Europe Ltd in 2010.

External links
 NTT Europe Company Site

NTT Communications

de:NTT Europe Online